The 2022 Madhya Pradesh panchayat elections will be held in three phases on 25 June, 1 July and 8 July 2022, in the Indian state of Madhya Pradesh.  voters will elect members to  posts, across all three tiers of the panchayats, and since Electronic voting machines aren't being used, over  of paper is expected to be used during the elections.

The Bharatiya Janata Party said it has won the district panchayat president and vice-president in 41 districts. The Indian National Congress claimed victories in 9 districts, whereas the Gondwana Ganatantra Party claimed victory in 1 district.

Election schedule
The Madhya Pradesh State Election Commission announced that the Polls would be held in three Phases.

Polling
The first phase of the polling was on 25 June. It covered 8,702 village panchayats and 26,902 polling stations. There were some instances of violence in some districts of the state. Election officials reported a voter turnout of 77%.

The second phase of the polling was on 1 July. It covered 7,655 village panchayats and 23,967 polling stations. There was a voter turnout of 80%.

The third and final phase of the polling was on 8 July. It covered 6,607 village panchayats and 20,608 polling stations. The overall voter turnout of all three phases was 80.31%.

See also
 2018 Madhya Pradesh Legislative Assembly election
 2019 Indian general election in Madhya Pradesh
 Panchayati raj

References

External links
 Madhya Pradesh State Election Commission

2020s in Madhya Pradesh
2022 elections in India
Elections in Madhya Pradesh